Mortonson–Van Leer Log Cabin (a.k.a. Schorn Log Cabin), is an historic cabin and one of the last historical dwellings in Swedesboro, Gloucester County, New Jersey, United States. It stands on the grounds of the cemetery of the Trinity Church. It is one of the oldest original log cabins of early Swedish-Finnish architecture in the United States.

History

The Mortonson–Van Leer Log Cabin was originally built along the north bank of the Raccoon River by Morton Mortenson, a Swedish-Finnish man who arrived in the Delaware Valley, at that time part of the colony of New Sweden, in May 1654. Mortenson's great-grandson, John Morton, would go on to sign the Declaration of Independence as a Pennsylvania delegate. The cabin consists of one small room with no windows and a single door and its walls are made of cedar logs and lime mortar caulk. The Cabin was also owned by a local notable Dr. Bernardhus Van Leer and later by the Van Leer family who were noted in the anti-slavery cause. Prior to and during the American Civil War, the Van Leer family used the Log Cabin as a station for the Underground Railroad to help slaves escape to free negro communities. Van Leers also built nearby villages for freed slaves and financially supported the Underground Railroad. Being originally located along Raccoon Creek on a terrain belonging to the Morton Mortenson Plantation, the cabin was donated by the Schorn Family to the Gloucester County Historical Society, who relocated the cabin to the cemetery located behind Trinity Episcopal Church in Swedesboro in 1989.

Architecture
The cabin is an example of the typical Swedish-Finnish cabin architecture, utilizing notched logs which overlapped corners, brought to the area upon the settlement of the New Sweden Colony.

See also 
 List of the oldest buildings in New Jersey
 Morton Homestead
 John Morton (American politician)
 Van Leer Cabin
 New Sweden Farmstead Museum

References

External links

 

Historic American Buildings Survey in New Jersey
Swedish-American history
Finnish-American history
Swedish American culture in New Jersey
Finnish-American culture in New Jersey
New Sweden
Van Leer family
American abolitionists
Underground Railroad
Houses on the Underground Railroad
Underground Railroad locations
American Anti-Slavery Society